

Asım Bezirci (Erzincan, 1927 – Sivas, 2 July 1993) was a Turkish critic, writer and poet. He was killed, along with 34 others, during the Sivas massacre in Sivas, Turkey when a group of Islamists set fire to the hotel where the victims had gathered for the Pir Sultan Abdal festival.

See also
List of Turkish writers
List of massacres in Turkey

References

External links
 

1927 births
1993 deaths
Deaths from fire
Mass murder victims
People murdered in Turkey
Turkish critics
Turkish Marxists
Turkish murder victims
Turkish poets
Turkish socialists
Turkish writers